Anna Nosova (born 22 December 2001) is a Ukrainian artistic swimmer. She is 2020 European Championships champion in highlights routine.

References

2001 births
Living people
Ukrainian synchronized swimmers
European Aquatics Championships medalists in synchronised swimming
21st-century Ukrainian women